Kyma is a visual programming language for sound design used by musicians, researchers, and sound designers. In Kyma, a user programs a multiprocessor DSP by graphically connecting modules on the screen of a Macintosh or Windows computer.

Background
Kyma has characteristics of both object-oriented and functional programming languages.  The basic unit in Kyma is the "Sound" object, not the "note" of traditional music notation.  A Sound is defined as:

i) a Sound atom 
ii) a unary transform T(s) where s is a Sound
iii) an n-ary transform T(s1, s2,.., sn), where s1,s2,..sn are Sounds

A Sound atom is a source of audio (like a microphone input or a noise generator), a unary transform modifies its argument (for example, a LowpassFilter might take a running average of its input), and an n-ary transform combines two or more Sounds (a Mixer, for example, is defined as the sum of its inputs).

History
The first version of Kyma, which computed digital audio samples on a Macintosh 512K was written in the Smalltalk programming language in 1986 by Carla Scaletti in Champaign, Illinois. In May 1987, Scaletti had partitioned Kyma into graphics and sound generation engines and ported the sound generation code to a digital signal processor called the Platypus designed by Lippold Haken and Kurt J. Hebel of the CERL Sound Group.

In 1987, Scaletti presented a paper on Kyma and demonstrated live digital sound generation on the Platypus at the International Computer Music Conference where it was identified by electronic synthesis pioneer Bob Moog as a technology to watch in his conference report for Keyboard Magazine:

One new language that acknowledges no distinction between sound synthesis and composition is Kyma, a music composition language for the Macintosh that views all elements in a piece of music, from the structure of a single sound to the structure of the entire composition, as objects to be composed.

When the University of Illinois at Urbana-Champaign eliminated the funding for the PLATO laboratory in 1989, Scaletti and Hebel formed Symbolic Sound Corporation in order to continue developing Kyma and digital audio signal processing hardware.

Selected filmography
 Wall-E
 War of the Worlds (2005)
 Finding Nemo
 Star Wars: Episode II – Attack of the Clones
 Star Wars: Episode III – Revenge of the Sith
 Master and Commander: The Far Side of the World

Selected discography
 Zooma (1999) by John Paul Jones
 Movement in Still Life (1999) by BT
 The Thunderthief (2001) by John Paul Jones
 Emotional Technology (2003) by BT
 On An Island (2006) by David Gilmour
 Today (2006) by Junkie XL
 Unidentified Sound Object (2006) by U.S.O. Project
 Recombinant Art 01
 Black Swan (2009) by Cristian Vogel
 ISAM (2011) by Amon Tobin
The Creation of the Universe by Metal Machine Trio (played by Sarth Calhoun)
GRUIS (2016) by Roland Emile Kuit
Bella's Lullaby Critical Mass Remix (2008) composed by Carter Burwell, prod. by Jason Bentley & Tobias Enhus

References

External links
 Symbolic Sound Corporation

Audio programming languages
Acoustics software
Software synthesizers
Visual programming languages